Buckeye is an unincorporated community in Mississippi County in the U.S. state of Missouri.

History
The community was also known as Bement.  A post office called Buckeye was established in 1895, and remained in operation until 1919. Buckeye was named for a grove of buckeye trees near the original town site.

References

Unincorporated communities in Mississippi County, Missouri
Unincorporated communities in Missouri